Super Bowl XXXI was an American football game between the American Football Conference (AFC) champion New England Patriots and the National Football Conference (NFC) champion Green Bay Packers to decide the National Football League (NFL) champion for the 1996 season. The Packers defeated the Patriots by the score of 35–21, earning their third overall Super Bowl victory, and their first since Super Bowl II. The Packers also extended their league record for the most overall NFL championships to 12. It was also the last in a run of 13 straight Super Bowl victories by the NFC over the AFC. The game was played on January 26, 1997 at the Louisiana Superdome in New Orleans, Louisiana.

This Super Bowl featured two clubs that had recently returned to competitiveness. After 24 mostly dismal seasons since Vince Lombardi left, the Packers' fortunes turned after head coach Mike Holmgren and quarterback Brett Favre joined the team in 1992. After four losing seasons, the Patriots' rise began in 1993 when Bill Parcells was hired as head coach, and the team drafted quarterback Drew Bledsoe. Under their respective head coaches and quarterbacks, Green Bay posted an NFC-best 13–3 regular season record in 1996, while New England advanced to their second Super Bowl after recording an 11–5 record in what would be their first of ten Super Bowl appearances under owner Robert Kraft.

The game began with the teams combining for 24 first-quarter points, the most in Super Bowl history. The Packers then scored 17 unanswered points in the second quarter, including Favre's then-Super Bowl record 81-yard touchdown pass to wide receiver Antonio Freeman.  In the third quarter, the Patriots cut the lead to 27–21 off of running back Curtis Martin's 18-yard rushing touchdown. But on the ensuing kickoff, Desmond Howard returned the ball a then-Super Bowl record 99 yards for a touchdown. The score proved to be the last one, as both teams' defenses took over the rest of the game. Howard became the first special teams player ever to be named Super Bowl MVP. He gained a total of 154 kickoff return yards, and also recorded a then-Super Bowl record 90 punt return yards, thus tying the then-Super Bowl records of total return yards (244) and combined net yards gained (244).

This was the first Super Bowl broadcast by Fox under its first contract to carry NFL games. By a large margin it was the highest-rated program aired in the network's history at the time.

Background
NFL owners awarded Super Bowl XXXI to New Orleans during their October 26, 1993 meeting in Chicago. This was the eighth time that New Orleans hosted the game.

New England Patriots

After coach Raymond Berry benched and then cut future CFL record-setting MVP and champion Doug Flutie before being fired himself in 1989, the Patriots had three more losing seasons, including a dismal 1–15 regular season record in 1990. Then, in 1993, New England turned to veteran head coach Bill Parcells to lead the team, hoping to repeat the success he had with the New York Giants.

Although the Patriots posted a 5–11 regular season record during Parcells' first year, eight of their losses were by 7 points or fewer. To Parcells' credit, much of the improvement was the result of the contributions from their draft picks that they made before the season: linebackers Willie McGinest and Chris Slade. Tight end Ben Coates also became a major contributor as a favorite target of quarterback Drew Bledsoe, who was taken with the #1 overall pick in the 1993 draft.  With that improvement, the team was sold to Robert Kraft in January 1994 for a then-record price of $200 million.  It was an astonishing price considering the Pats had long been considered a laughing-stock by local and national media as well as opponents, and had one of the worst stadiums in the league (Foxboro Stadium). During the losing spell they had rarely sold out, resulting in most games going without local television coverage. Sports in New England at that time centered on the beloved, successful, Celtics and Red Sox, and even Bruins, not the NFL team orphaned in remote Foxborough, Massachusetts, thirty miles outside Boston.  (During an earlier run of 13 years in the 1970s and 1980s with only 1 losing season, the very competitive Patriots sold out that venue regularly.)

The team then posted a 10–6 record in 1994 after starting the regular season at 3–6, but were eliminated by the Cleveland Browns in their first playoff game. The Krafts had also eliminated the practice of TV blackouts (and courted and nailed deals with local affiliates), and the season resulted in a resurgence of popularity in the NFL game across the region. New England then had a let down and failed to make the playoffs in 1995, a year when many organizations were coming to grips with the new salary cap put in by the NFL to improve competition in the league. In the offseason, Parcells hired his old Giants defensive coordinator, Bill Belichick, as assistant head coach and defensive backs coach. Part of the team's spotty performance that season might have been that the head coach, Parcells, and the new owner, Kraft, did not get along well. Belichick came to serve during the 1996 season as the head coach's interface with the Kraft family and the non-football operations side of the business.

After losing their first two games in the 1996 regular season with lackluster performances, the Patriots ran through the rest of the season competitive in every game, finishing with an 11–5 record (their best in the Parcells era) and winning the AFC East. The Patriots' offense became the 7th-best unit in the league in terms of yards, and 2nd-best (behind the Packers) in points. Their pass offense, led by Bledsoe and wide receiver Terry Glenn, ranked third in the NFL. Bledsoe threw for 4,086 yards and 27 touchdowns against 15 interceptions. Glenn set a rookie record with 90 receptions, which yielded 1,132 yards and 6 touchdowns. Tight end Ben Coates was also a big contributor, catching 62 passes for 682 yards and 9 touchdowns. Wide receiver Shawn Jefferson recorded 50 receptions for 771 yards and 4 touchdowns.

Running back Curtis Martin was the focal point of the rushing attack with his 1,152 yards and 14 touchdowns on the ground, while also catching 46 passes for another 333 yards and 3 touchdowns. Pro Bowl running back Dave Meggett provided the team with a good special teams threat, gaining 1,369 yards and a touchdown returning kickoffs and punts, while also rushing for 122 yards and catching 33 passes for 292 yards.

On defense, the team's main weapon was Pro Bowler McGinest, who recorded 49 tackles, 2 fumble recoveries, an interception which he returned 46 yards for a touchdown, and a team-leading 9.5 sacks.  Linebacker Chris Slade added 7 sacks and 3 forced fumbles. New England also had a solid secondary, led by defensive backs Willie Clay (72 tackles, a fumble recovery, 4 interceptions, 50 return yards), Ty Law (56 tackles, 3 interceptions, 45 return yards, 1 touchdown), and Lawyer Milloy (54 tackles, 1 sack, 1 fumble recovery, 2 interceptions).

Green Bay Packers

After winning Super Bowl II after the 1967 regular season, the Packers became a losing team for much of the 1970s and 1980s, only making the playoffs in 1972 and the strike-shortened 1982 season. In addition to having the reputation of being a poor team, the Packers were unable to attract good players because many did not want to play in Green Bay's cold winter climate for a small market team.

All that changed when former San Francisco 49ers offensive coordinator Mike Holmgren became the Packers head coach in 1992. During his first year, the team improved to a 9–7 regular season record, barely missing the playoffs. One of the significant players on the 1992 Packers team was second-year quarterback Brett Favre, who spent his rookie season as a third-string quarterback for the Atlanta Falcons. During a September 20, 1992 game against the Cincinnati Bengals, Favre replaced injured starter Don Majkowski and proceeded to lead the team to a comeback victory. Afterwards, Favre became the starter for the rest of that season and held that position with the Packers until his purported retirement and subsequent conditional trade to the New York Jets in 2008 (followed by a departure for Minnesota in 2009).

Green Bay then made the playoffs in the 1993, 1994, and the 1995 seasons. As Holmgren, Favre, and the Packers continued to win, they were able to attract impact free agents like veteran defensive end Reggie White, nicknamed the "Minister of Defense", who joined the team in 1993.

In 1996, the Packers posted an NFC-best 13–3 regular season record after winning eight of their first nine games to start the season. After losing two straight games in November, they finished off the regular season winning their remaining five games, including dominating wins over two playoff teams: the Denver Broncos, 41–6, and the Minnesota Vikings, 38–10. The Packers' defense also led the league in both fewest points and yards allowed. They allowed 210 points and also scored an NFL-best 456 points, becoming the first team since the 1972 Miami Dolphins to score the most points in the league and allow the fewest. They set an NFL record with seven wins by at least 25 points.

Favre won the NFL Most Valuable Player Award for the second straight season after throwing for 3,899 yards and an NFC record 39 touchdown passes during the 1996 regular season, with only 13 interceptions. His 39 touchdown passes was the third-highest total in league history at that time. Favre was also a good runner, ranking third on the team with 136 rushing yards and scoring 2 touchdowns.

The Packers had another valuable asset in game-breaking kick returner Desmond Howard. The former Heisman Trophy winner's NFL career as a wide receiver was widely viewed as a disappointment up until this point, recording just 92 receptions in his first four NFL seasons. After joining Green Bay before the 1996 season, the team used him as a kick returner. Howard excelled in this role and ended up setting an NFL record with 875 punt return yards, while also leading the league in yards per return (15.1) and punt return touchdowns (3). He also caught 13 passes for 95 yards and added another 460 yards returning kickoffs.

Green Bay also had a number of offensive weapons. Wide receiver Antonio Freeman led the team with 933 yards and 9 touchdowns. Multi-talented veteran wide receiver Don Beebe was also a constant breakaway threat, catching 39 passes for 606 yards and adding another 403 yards and a touchdown returning kickoffs. Beebe was a member of the Buffalo Bills during their four Super Bowl losses, and was thus extremely eager for another shot at a Super Bowl win.  Late in the season, after a string of injuries sent star receiver Robert Brooks out for the season and caused Freeman to miss four games, Green Bay made another big addition to their receiving corps by signing Andre Rison, who had been cut by the Jacksonville Jaguars, and finished the season with 47 receptions for 593 yards and 3 touchdowns. The Packers also had two outstanding tight ends: Pro Bowler Keith Jackson recorded 40 catches for 504 yards and 10 touchdowns, and Mark Chmura had 28 receptions for 370 yards.

Although Green Bay's running game did not have any standout backs or Pro Bowlers, running backs Dorsey Levens and Edgar Bennett, and fullback William Henderson were all very good at blocking, running, and receiving. Bennett was the team's leading rusher with 899 yards, while also catching 31 passes for 176 yards and scored 3 touchdowns. Levens rushed for 566 yards, caught 31 passes for 226 yards, returned 5 kickoffs for 84 yards, and scored 10 touchdowns. Henderson had 130 rushing yards, caught 27 passes for 203 yards, and returned 2 kickoffs for 38 yards. Up front, Pro Bowl center Frank Winters anchored the offensive line, along with guard Adam Timmerman.

On defense, White continued to be a weapon, recording 29 tackles, 3 fumble recoveries, and led the team with 8.5 sacks. Defensive tackle Santana Dotson was also a big asset, recording 5.5 sacks and a fumble recovery. In the secondary, the team was led by safety Eugene Robinson, who recorded 55 tackles, 6 interceptions, and 107 return yards. Defensive back LeRoy Butler was also a major force, recording 65 tackles, 6.5 sacks, 2 fumble recoveries, and 5 interceptions for 149 return yards and a touchdown.

Playoffs

Aided by Martin's 166 rushing yards and 3 touchdowns, including a 78-yard touchdown run in the 2nd quarter, the Patriots first eliminated the defending AFC champion Pittsburgh Steelers, 28–3. New England gained a total of 346 yards in the game, while limiting Steelers quarterback Mike Tomczak to just 110 passing yards with no touchdowns and 2 interceptions.

The Patriots then defeated the Jacksonville Jaguars 20–6 in the AFC Championship Game. The Jaguars, an expansion team in 1995, advanced after upsetting the AFC's top seed, the Denver Broncos. However, New England took advantage of several key Jacksonville miscues in a game dominated by defense. A bad snap allowed Patriots defensive back Larry Whigham to tackle Jaguars punter Bryan Barker at the Jacksonville 4-yard line, setting up Martin's 1-yard touchdown run a few plays later. The Jaguars scored a field goal in the 2nd quarter, but Jacksonville punt returner Chris Hudson's fumble set up Patriots kicker Adam Vinatieri's 29-yard field goal. Eventually, the teams exchanged field goals, and the Patriots led 13–6 going into the 4th quarter. With under 4 minutes left in the game, the Jaguars reached the New England 5-yard line, but Patriots safety Willie Clay intercepted a pass in the end zone. After New England was forced to punt, cornerback Otis Smith recovered a fumble from Jaguars running back James Stewart and returned it 47 yards for a touchdown to put the game away.

Meanwhile, the Packers first eliminated the San Francisco 49ers, 35–14. Green Bay's defense and special teams dominated the game, forcing 5 turnovers, and helped the team score 35 points even though Favre was limited to just 79 passing yards. San Francisco starting quarterback Steve Young, who was still suffering from a rib injury sustained during the 49ers' 14–0 playoff win over the Philadelphia Eagles the previous week, had to leave the game in the 1st quarter. Howard opened up the scoring by returning a punt 71 yards for a touchdown. Later, he returned a punt 46 yards to set up Favre's 4-yard touchdown pass to Andre Rison. By the time the first half ended, Green Bay had a commanding 21–7 lead. San Francisco cut their deficit to 7 points with a 3rd-quarter touchdown, but the Packers responded by driving 72 yards to score a touchdown of their own, in which a fumble by Bennett was recovered in the end zone by Freeman.  Green Bay then put the game away with an 11-yard touchdown run by Bennett.

Green Bay then defeated the Carolina Panthers 30–13 in the NFC Championship Game. Like the Jaguars, the Panthers were a 1995 expansion team that advanced to the conference title game. But unlike Jacksonville, Carolina came into the contest as the NFC's #2 seed and had eliminated the defending Super Bowl champion Dallas Cowboys, 26–17. In the NFC Championship Game, Carolina scored first with a 3-yard touchdown reception by Howard Griffith, but Green Bay scored on two touchdown passes by Favre and a field goal in the 2nd quarter to take a 17–10 halftime lead. The Packers then dominated the second half, only allowing one more field goal from the Panthers. Levens recorded 5 catches for 117 yards and a touchdown, along with 88 rushing yards. Bennett rushed for 99 yards and a touchdown. Favre threw for 292 yards and 2 touchdowns with 1 interception. Kicker Chris Jacke scored three field goals. By advancing to the Super Bowl, the Packers broke a streak since Super Bowl XXVI that had either the Dallas Cowboys or the San Francisco 49ers representing the NFC in the championship game. It also marked the Packers' first Super Bowl appearance since winning the first two to culminate their dynasty under Lombardi and Hall of Fame quarterback Bart Starr.

Super Bowl pregame news and notes
The Packers were favored to win the game by 14 points, largely because many thought the Patriots were a Cinderella team, and because of the recent dominance of the NFC in Super Bowl games.

The signing of Andre Rison by Green Bay late in the season had been a surprise to the league.  Rison had been released by two teams over the previous two years and was known as a serious disciplinary problem for skipping team meetings.  The previous year, the Packers had tried to sign Rison and Favre had spoken positively when a deal was not reached, stating "We saved a lot of money, and a lot of heartache because he was a problem internally."  Rison later replied that if he were a defensive player, "I'd try to break his face."  He also added "maybe a couple of years ago, I would have said he's a hillbilly jealous of a black man making money. But now I'm at this age. No comment."

Much of the pregame hype surrounded the conflict between Parcells and Patriots owner Robert Kraft. Kraft took control of the team after Parcells was hired, and the two of them had different ideas on how to run the organization. Six days before the Super Bowl, in an article by Will McDonough, The Boston Globe reported Parcells would leave the Patriots after the Super Bowl to become the coach of the New York Jets. The book Patriot Reign alleges the Patriots have cell phone records showing Parcells was in constant contact with the Jets during the week. Then-Patriots defensive coordinator (and now head coach) Bill Belichick is quoted as saying Parcells' plans to leave for the Jets were a distraction, "Yeah, I'd say it was a little bit of a distraction all the way around. I can tell you first-hand, there was a lot of stuff going on prior to the game. I mean, him talking to other teams. He was trying to make up his mind about what he was going to do. Which, honestly, I felt [was] totally inappropriate. How many chances do you get to play for the Super Bowl? Tell them to get back to you in a couple of days. I'm not saying it was disrespectful to me, but it was in terms of the overall commitment to the team." Parcells even refused to travel back with the rest of the Patriots after the game, and was eventually hired by the rival Jets.

To honor former NFL commissioner Pete Rozelle, who died on December 6, 1996, each player wore a special helmet decal with Rozelle's signature, "Pete", printed across the NFL logo. Tributes to Rozelle were also published in the game program.

Coincidentally, the first Super Bowl appearance for the Patriots was also in the Superdome and against an NFC Central team. In Super Bowl XX, the Patriots lost to the Chicago Bears, whose rivalry with the Packers is said to be the NFL's oldest.

As the designated home team, the Packers wore their home green uniforms and gold pants, while the Patriots went with their road white uniforms and silver pants.

Broadcasting
The game was the first Super Bowl to be televised in the United States by the Fox network. Play-by-play announcer Pat Summerall and color commentator John Madden, both previously of CBS, called the game. James Brown hosted all the events with help from his fellow Fox NFL Sunday cast members Terry Bradshaw, Howie Long, and Ronnie Lott.

This was the first of three Super Bowls to be called by Summerall and Madden while with Fox (Super Bowls XXXIII and XXXVI being the others).

Starting with this game, through Super Bowl XXXVII, the Super Bowl logo was painted at the 50-yard line, and the teams' helmets were placed on the 30-yard lines.  In the past Super Bowl games since Super Bowl VI, the NFL logo was painted on the 50-yard line, except for Super Bowls XXV and XXIX. The Super Bowl XXV logo was painted at midfield, and the NFL 75th Anniversary logo was painted at midfield in Super Bowl XXIX. The league started to put the NFL logo at midfield again for Super Bowl XXXVIII.

The telecast ended up being the highest-rated program in the history of the then ten-year-old Fox network, and it currently ties Super Bowl XLII for the highest-rated program in the entire history of the network. Afterwards, Fox televised The X-Files episode "Leonard Betts". Fox's broadcast was also the first Super Bowl to have a constant, live-updating graphic for the score, time and down & distance. The FoxBox was used also in Super Bowl XXXIII, and the graphic positioned over live action has become the norm in virtually all sports broadcasts at the national and regional production levels.

With the Packers' win, they became the third team to win Super Bowls on three networks (I-broadcast on both CBS and NBC, II-CBS, and Fox). They also became the first team to win three Super Bowls with Fox as one of the networks to televise their win. The previous seven games played in domes were all won by the designated road team, which wore white. The game was rematched on October 27, 1997, as a near-national telecast on ABC's Monday Night Football, the only time ABC aired a rematch of the previous season's Super Bowl.

Entertainment

Pregame ceremonies
The pregame show featured Los del Río, who performed their multi-platinum smash hit "Macarena", the dance craze that became a worldwide summer hit in 1996. Country singer-songwriter Mary Chapin Carpenter and Cajun musical group BeauSoleil also appeared singing Carpenter's hit "Down at the Twist and Shout".

R&B singer Luther Vandross later sang the national anthem, and Miss Louisiana 1996 Erika Schwarz Wright performed sign language for the national anthem.

The coin toss ceremony featured the winning head coaches of the previous Super Bowl games played in New Orleans: Hank Stram (Super Bowl IV), Tom Landry (Super Bowl VI, Super Bowl XII), Chuck Noll (Super Bowl IX), Tom Flores (Super Bowl XV), Mike Ditka (Super Bowl XX), and George Seifert (Super Bowl XXIV). Hank Stram was given the honor of doing the coin toss.

Halftime show 

The halftime show was titled "Blues Brothers Bash" and featured actors Dan Aykroyd, John Goodman, and Jim Belushi as The Blues Brothers. The show highlighted blues music and also had performances by the rock band ZZ Top and singer James Brown.

Game summary
The Packers outgained the Patriots 323 yards to 257 and intercepted quarterback Drew Bledsoe four times. Packers defensive end Reggie White set a Super Bowl record with three sacks, including back to back takedowns in the 3rd quarter.

First quarter
Green Bay forced New England to punt on the opening possession of the game and started their first drive with great field position after receiver Desmond Howard returned the ball 32 yards to the Packers 46-yard line. Green Bay then opened up the scoring with Brett Favre's 54-yard touchdown pass to wide receiver Andre Rison on their second offensive play of the game. Then on the Patriots' ensuing drive, Packers defensive back Doug Evans intercepted a pass from Bledsoe at the Patriots 28-yard line. On the first play after the turnover, Patriots lineman Ferric Collons sacked Favre for a 10-yard loss, but running back Dorsey Levens rushed for 4 yards and caught a pass for 14 over the next two plays, setting up Chris Jacke's 37-yard field goal to make the score 10–0.

New England stormed back, scoring touchdowns on each of their next two possessions. On the second play of the Patriots' ensuing drive, Bledsoe completed a 32-yard screen pass to fullback Keith Byars and followed it up with a "dump-off" pass to running back Curtis Martin, who caught the ball near the line of scrimmage and ran 20 yards to the Packers 27-yard line before being tackled. Bledsoe then threw three straight incompletions, but on the third one, Packers cornerback Craig Newsome was called for a 26-yard pass interference penalty, giving New England a first down at the 1-yard line. On the next play, Bledsoe completed a 1-yard touchdown pass to Byars to cut his team's deficit to 10–7.

New England's defense then forced the Packers to punt from their own 17-yard line after a three-and-out, giving the Patriots the ball back after running back Dave Meggett received Craig Hentrich's 39-yard punt at the Patriots 43-yard line. After a 7-yard reception and a 2-yard run by Martin on their first two plays, Bledsoe completed a 44-yard pass to wide receiver Terry Glenn to advance to the Green Bay 4-yard line. From there, tight end Ben Coates' 4-yard touchdown reception gave New England a 14–10 lead. The Packers and Patriots combined for 24 points, the most ever scored in the 1st quarter of a Super Bowl. The Patriots became the first team in Super Bowl history to score 14 points in the first quarter and lose the game.

Second quarter
New England's lead was short-lived. After both teams exchanged punts, Favre threw a Super Bowl-record 81-yard touchdown pass to receiver Antonio Freeman, putting the Packers back in the lead, 17–14.  Then on third down of the ensuing Patriots drive, strong safety LeRoy Butler powered through Meggett's block attempt and managed to drag Bledsoe down with one arm for a 9-yard sack, forcing a Tom Tupa punt that Howard returned 34 yards to the Patriots 47-yard line. The Packers then drove to the 14-yard line, featuring a 23-yard reception by Rison and a 12-yard run by Levens, to score on Jacke's 31-yard field goal to increase their lead to 20–14.

Meggett returned the ensuing kickoff 21 yards to the Patriots 25-yard line. On the first play of the drive, Bledsoe completed a 19-yard pass to Coates to advance to their own 44-yard line. But two plays later, Packers free safety Mike Prior intercepted a long pass that was intended for wide receiver Shawn Jefferson, and returned it 8 yards to the Packers 26-yard line. After the turnover, Favre completed a 22-yard pass to Freeman, and Levens rushed four times for 31 yards on a 9-play, 74-yard drive that took 5:59 minutes off the clock and ended with Favre's 2-yard touchdown run to give Green Bay a 27–14 lead with just 1:11 left in the half.

After a 24-yard kickoff return by Meggett, Bledsoe completed an 18-yard pass to Coates, and followed it up with a 10-yard pass to Glenn. Then after a 1-yard run by Meggett on the next play, Bledsoe completed a 7-yard pass to receiver Vincent Brisby to bring up 3rd down and 2 yards to go from the Packers 42-yard line. However, Green Bay's defense forced two incompletions from Bledsoe, causing the Patriots to turn the ball over on downs with just 19 seconds left before halftime. The Packers tried to get into scoring range by calling a pass on the next play, but linebacker Willie McGinest sacked Favre, and the score remained 27–14 at halftime.

Third quarter
Howard returned the second half kickoff 23 yards to the Green Bay 25-yard line. From there, Favre led the Packers all the way to the New England 37, but the Patriots made a key defensive stand, stopping Levens for no gain on 3rd down and 1, and then tackling him again for a 7-yard loss on 4th down. Then after driving to the Packers 41-yard line, New England was forced to punt, but they managed to pin Green Bay deep in their own territory when Howard made a fair catch of Tupa's 29-yard punt at the 12-yard line. On the ensuing drive, a 7-yard sack by Patriots cornerback Otis Smith helped the New England defense force the Packers to punt, and the Patriots got the ball back with great field position after Meggett returned Craig Hentrich's 48-yard punt 6 yards to the New England 47-yard line.

Taking advantage of their excellent starting field position, New England drove 53 yards in 7 plays and scored on an 18-yard touchdown run by Martin to cut the Packers' lead to 27–21. But on the ensuing kickoff, Howard returned the ball 99 yards for a touchdown – the longest play in Super Bowl history (later broken in Super Bowl XLIII, and broken again in Super Bowl XLVII). Favre then completed a pass to tight end Mark Chmura for a successful two-point conversion, giving the Packers a 35–21 lead.

Fourth quarter
The score proved to be the last one of the contest, as the defenses of both teams took over for the rest of the game. The Patriots limited the Packers to three punts and a missed 47-yard field goal attempt by Jacke. Green Bay did even better, not allowing New England to advance past their own 32-yard line. Furthermore, White sacked Bledsoe on back to back plays on the Patriots' first drive after Howard's game-clinching touchdown return. White then recorded a third sack late in the 4th quarter. Bledsoe was also intercepted twice in the final period (one by Newsome and the other one by linebacker Brian Williams).

After the game, Favre reflected on his long road to becoming a Super Bowl champion, which included the death of his friend Mark Harvy in a car accident during the season. "Through everything I really believed I'd be here today. Right here in this stairwell, talking about being world champions. My best friend's gone forever. Trouble never seems to be far away, and the future won't be all rosy, but they can't take this away from me. Thirty years from now, the kids will be getting ready for Super Bowl LXI, and NFL Films will drag out Steve Sabol — he'll be around 102 then — and he'll talk about how Brett Favre fought through such adversity. And there will be other players and coaches. But I know this: We etched our place in history today."

Freeman was the top receiver of the game, finishing with 105 receiving yards and a touchdown on only 3 receptions. Dorsey Levens was the game's leading rusher with 61 rushing yards, and caught 3 passes for 23 yards. Favre completed 14 out of 27 passes for 246 yards and 2 touchdowns, and had 12 rushing yards and another touchdown on 4 carries. Favre became the first Super Bowl-winning quarterback to have at least three touchdowns (Favre had 2 throwing, 1 rushing) and not be named Super Bowl MVP.

Bledsoe finished the game with 11 more pass completions (25) than Favre, but only 7 more total passing yards (253). His four interceptions tied a Super Bowl record. Martin was limited to just 41 rushing yards and 1 touchdown on 11 carries, but he also caught 3 passes for 28 yards. Meggett recorded 155 combined net yards (117 kick return, 30 punt return, 8 receiving). Coates was the Patriots' leading receiver with 6 catches for 67 yards and a touchdown.

This was the first Super Bowl played at the Superdome in which the home (and losing) team's point total was something other than 10. The Dallas Cowboys beat the Denver Broncos 27–10 in Super Bowl XII, the Oakland Raiders defeated the Philadelphia Eagles 27–10 in Super Bowl XV, the Chicago Bears beat the New England Patriots 46–10 in Super Bowl XX, and the San Francisco 49ers beat the Denver Broncos 55–10 in Super Bowl XXIV.

Box score

Final statistics
Sources: NFL.com Super Bowl XXXI, Super Bowl XXXI Play Finder GB, Super Bowl XXXI Play Finder NE

Statistical comparison

Individual statistics

1Completions/attempts
2Carries
3Long gain
4Receptions
5Times targeted

Records set

The following records were set in Super Bowl XXXI, according to the official NFL.com boxscore, the 2016 NFL Record & Fact Book and the ProFootball reference.com game summary. Some records have to meet NFL minimum number of attempts to be recognized. The minimums are shown (in parenthesis).
 

 † This category includes rushing, receiving, interception returns, punt returns, kickoff returns, and fumble returns.

Turnovers are defined as the number of times losing the ball on interceptions and fumbles.

Starting lineups
Source:

Aftermath

Packers

The Packers returned to the Super Bowl again the following year but were then outfought by the Denver Broncos in Super Bowl XXXII in San Diego, marking the first of their two consecutive Super Bowls to conclude the Hall of Fame career of John Elway. In 2007, the Packers were favored to return to the Super Bowl to face the Patriots again but were upset at Lambeau Field by the eventual champion New York Giants, who went on to knock off the previously undefeated Patriots. It proved to be Favre's final game as a Packer, but three years later, Favre's successor Aaron Rodgers helped drive the Packers to regain the Vince Lombardi Trophy in Super Bowl XLV in Dallas against the Pittsburgh Steelers. This was the Packers’ last win in the Superdome for 23 years; their next win wouldn't come until Week 3 of the 2020 season.

Patriots

Five years later, Belichick had returned to the Patriots and was in his second season as head coach, while Milloy, Law, Vinatieri, McGinest, Tedy Bruschi and Otis Smith, who all played in this Super Bowl, were still with the team when they made an unexpected return to the Superdome to face the "Greatest Show on Turf" St. Louis Rams in Super Bowl XXXVI. Bledsoe was also still there, but was now backing up Tom Brady, who was then just a second-year player who had thrown only three passes in his rookie season but had gone 11-3 as a starter to finish the regular season after Bledsoe had been knocked out in Week 2 against the Jets. (Bledsoe had replaced Brady after Pittsburgh's Lee Flowers knocked Brady out of the AFC Championship Game and proceeded to throw for a touchdown.) Law gave the Patriots a lead with an interception return for a touchdown off St. Louis' MVP Kurt Warner, and eventually, Vinatieri's 48-yard field goal as time expired following a clutch Brady drive – the first time a Super Bowl was won with a score on the final play – gave the Patriots a 20–17 upset victory and their first Super Bowl on their third visit to the Superdome on the NFL's ultimate stage. It also marked the birth of the Patriots' dynasty as the first of six Super Bowl victories in nine appearances under Brady and Belichick.

Officials
 Referee: Gerald Austin #34 second Super Bowl (XXIV as side judge)
 Umpire: Ron Botchan #110 fourth Super Bowl (XX, XXVII, XXIX)
 Head Linesman: Earnie Frantz #111 second Super Bowl (XXIV)
 Line Judge: Jeff Bergman #32 first Super Bowl
 Back Judge: Scott Steenson #88 first Super Bowl
 Side Judge: Tom Fincken #47 second Super Bowl (XXIX)
 Field Judge: Phil Luckett #59 first Super Bowl
 Alternate Referee: Ed Hochuli #85
 Alternate Umpire: Neil Gereb #50

Jeff Bergman and his father, Jerry Bergman Sr., became the first father-son combination to officiate Super Bowls. Jerry was the head linesman (now down judge) for four Super Bowls (XIII, XVI, XVIII, XXIII).

References

Specific

General

External links
 Super Bowl XXXI Memories Video.
 Super Bowl official website
 The Sporting News: History of the Super Bowl (Last accessed December 4, 2005)
 Large online database of NFL data and statistics
 Super Bowl play-by-plays from USA Today (Last accessed September 28, 2005)
 All-Time Super Bowl Odds from The Sports Network (Last accessed October 16, 2005)

Green Bay Packers postseason
New England Patriots postseason
Super Bowl
1996 National Football League season
1997 in American football
American football competitions in New Orleans
1997 in sports in Louisiana
1990s in New Orleans
1997 in American sports
January 1997 sports events in the United States
1997 in American television
Brett Favre